Mónica Castaño Agudelo (born 5 June 1989) is a Colombian beauty queen and model.

Colombia's Next Top Model 
Castaño was selected to be one of the final fifteen contestants of the first cycle of Colombia's Next Top Model. She was voted as one of the four finalists by the Colombian public with 17.8% of the vote, becoming one of the "Chicas Águila" for 2013 along with Anggie Bryan, Claudia Castro and Lis Henao. She beat out Bryan, Castro and Henao to win the competition. Her prizes included $100,000,000 in cash and a cover of Cromos magazine.

Pageantry 
Castaño represented Pradera at the Señorita Valle 2011 pageant, where she was the vicereine. She is Miss Grand Colombia 2014 and Miss Orito Ingi-Ande 2014. In October 2014, she represented Colombia at the Miss Grand International 2014 pageant in Bangkok, where she finished as the fourth-runner-up to Daryanne Lees of Cuba.where she finished as the second runner-up to Stephania Stegman of Paraguay.

References 

1989 births
Colombia's Next Top Model
Colombian beauty pageant winners
Living people
Next Top Model winners
Miss Supranational contestants
Miss Grand International contestants